Elandsfontein may refer to:

 Elandsfontein, an archaeological site near Hopefield, South Africa
 Elandsfontein, a farm homestead that is now a suburb of Alberton, South Africa